John Alexander Macdonald Armstrong (November 19, 1877 in King Township, Ontario, Canada – February 2, 1926) was a Canadian politician, conveyancer and real estate agent. He was elected to the House of Commons of Canada in the 1911 election as a Member of the historical Conservative Party and re-elected in 1917 as a Unionist. He ran in the elections of 1908 and 1921 as a Conservative and lost both elections. Prior to his federal political experience, he served on King Township council as reeve of the township in 1908.

External links 
 

1877 births
1926 deaths
Conservative Party of Canada (1867–1942) MPs
Members of the House of Commons of Canada from Ontario
Unionist Party (Canada) MPs
People from King, Ontario